"Zor and Zam" is a song written by Bill and John Chadwick and recorded by The Monkees for their 1968 album The Birds, The Bees & The Monkees. It was also featured in the final episode of season 2 of the band's popular television series, entitled "The Frodis Caper". The song involves the preparations for a war between two monarchs of rival kingdoms; however, when it comes time to fight, no one shows up and the war never happens.

The song appeared in a markedly different mix on the television show than it did on The Birds, The Bees & The Monkees, featuring an alternate vocal take, and lacking the horn and string overdubs.

Personnel
Micky Dolenz - Lead Vocal, Percussion
Keith Allison and Bill Chadwick - Electric guitars
Chip Douglas, Richard Dey and Max Bennett - Bass
Michael Melvoin - Piano
Eddie Hoh - Drums
Hal Blaine, Milt Holland and Stan Levey - Drums, Percussion, Gong, Timpani
Henry Diltz - Percussion
Milt Bernhart, Richard Leith, Lew McCreary and Frank Rosolino - Trombone
Buddy Childers, Clyde Reasinger, Jack Sheldon and Anthony Terran - Trumpet
Nathan Kaproff, George Kast, Marvin Limonick, Alex Murray, Erno Neufeld and Ambrose Russo - Violin
John Lowe - Saxophone, Woodwind
Shorty Rogers - Arrangement

See also
 List of anti-war songs

References

The Monkees songs
1968 songs
Songs of the Vietnam War